The Federal Route 102, also known as Pos Betau–Lembah Bertam Road, is a  federal highway in Pahang, Malaysia. It is built as the third access road to the district of Cameron Highlands, Pahang after the Federal Route 59 and 185. The completion of the highway makes it possible for Pahangite motorists to visit Cameron Highlands without leaving the state of Pahang.

Route background
The Kilometre Zero of the Federal Route 102 is located at Ringlet, Cameron Highlands.

History
Cameron Highlands used to be only accessible via the old Route 59 from Tapah, Perak. The Second East–West Highway FT185 became the most popular alternative to the narrow, winding FT59 old road. Despite the completion of the newer FT185 highway, motorists from Pahang who wished to go to Cameron Highlands had to access the hill station from the outside of Pahang.

The study of the need for a new direct highway to Cameron Highlands within Pahang was done in 1996. Construction started in 1999 and the highway was constructed in stages until it was fully completed in March 2010. The Federal Route 102 was constructed at the total cost of RM806 million.

When completed, the journey from Kuantan to Cameron Highlands has been shortened by 80 km compared to the same journey via the Second East-West Highway from Gua Musang, Kelantan.

Features
At most sections, the Federal Route 102 was built under the JKR R5 road standard, allowing maximum speed limit of up to 90 km/h.

List of junctions and towns

References

Malaysian Federal Roads
Highways in Malaysia